Gerris lateralis is a Palearctic species of  true bug. It is aquatic.

References

External links
Aquatic heteroptera recording scheme for Britain and Ireland

Gerrini
Hemiptera of Europe
Insects described in 1832
Taxa named by Theodor Emil Schummel